Roscoe Conkling "Fatty" Arbuckle (March 24, 1887 – June 29, 1933) was an American silent film actor, comedian, director, and screenwriter. He started at the Selig Polyscope Company and eventually moved to Keystone Studios, where he worked with Mabel Normand and Harold Lloyd as well as with his nephew, Al St. John. He also mentored Charlie Chaplin, Monty Banks and Bob Hope, and brought vaudeville star Buster Keaton into the movie business. Arbuckle was one of the most popular silent stars of the 1910s and one of the highest-paid actors in Hollywood, signing a contract in 1920 with Paramount Pictures for $1,000,000 a year.

Arbuckle was the defendant in three widely publicized trials between November 1921 and April 1922 for the rape and manslaughter of actress Virginia Rappe. Rappe had fallen ill at a party hosted by Arbuckle at San Francisco's St. Francis Hotel in September 1921, and died four days later. A friend of Rappe accused Arbuckle of raping and accidentally killing her. The first two trials resulted in hung juries, but Keaton testified for the defense in the third trial, which acquitted Arbuckle. The third jury took the unusual step of giving Arbuckle a written statement of apology for his treatment by the justice system.

Despite Arbuckle's acquittal, the scandal has mostly overshadowed his legacy as a pioneering comedian. At the behest of Adolph Zukor, president of Famous Players-Lasky, his films were banned by motion picture industry censor Will H. Hays after the trial, and he was publicly ostracized. Zukor was faced with the moral outrage of various groups such as the Lord's Day Alliance, the powerful Federation of Women's Clubs and even the Federal Trade Commission to curb what they perceived as Hollywood debauchery run amok and its effect on the morals of the general public.  While Arbuckle saw a resurgence in his popularity immediately after his third trial (in which he was acquitted) Zukor decided he had to be sacrificed to keep the movie industry out of the clutches of censors and moralists.  Hays lifted the ban within a year, but Arbuckle only worked sparingly through the 1920s. In their deal, Keaton promised to give him 35% of the Buster Keaton Comedies Co. profits. He later worked as a film director under the pseudonym William Goodrich. He was finally able to return to acting, making short two-reel comedies in 1932–33 for Warner Bros.

Arbuckle died in his sleep of a heart attack in 1933 at age 46, reportedly on the day that he signed a contract with Warner Bros. to make a feature film.

Early life
Roscoe Arbuckle was born on March 24, 1887, in Smith Center, Kansas, one of nine children of Mary E. Gordon and William Goodrich Arbuckle. Consequently, he named him after Senator Roscoe Conkling of New York, a notorious philanderer whom he despised. The birth was traumatic for Mary and resulted in chronic health problems that contributed to her death eleven years later.

Arbuckle was nearly two when his family moved to Santa Ana, California. He first performed on stage with Frank Bacon's company at age 8 during their performance in Santa Ana. Arbuckle enjoyed performing and continued on until his mother's death in 1898, when he was 11. Arbuckle's father had always treated him harshly and now refused to support him, so he got work doing odd jobs in a hotel. He was in the habit of singing while he worked, and a professional singer heard him and invited him to perform in an amateur talent show. The show consisted of the audience judging acts by clapping or jeering, with bad acts pulled off the stage by a shepherd's crook. Arbuckle sang, danced, and did some clowning around, but he did not impress the audience. He saw the crook emerging from the wings and somersaulted into the orchestra pit in obvious panic. The audience went wild, and he won the competition and began a career in vaudeville.

Career

In 1904, Sid Grauman invited Arbuckle to sing in his new Unique Theater in San Francisco, beginning a long friendship between the two. He then joined the Pantages Theatre Group touring the West Coast and in 1906 played the Orpheum Theater in Portland, Oregon, in a vaudeville troupe organized by Leon Errol. Arbuckle became the main act and the group took their show on tour.

On August 6, 1908, Arbuckle married Minta Durfee (1889–1975), the daughter of Charles Warren Durfee and Flora Adkins. Durfee starred in many early comedy films, often with Arbuckle. They made a strange couple, as Minta was short and petite while Arbuckle tipped the scales at 300 lbs (136 kg). Arbuckle then joined the Morosco Burbank Stock vaudeville company and went on a tour of China and Japan, returning in early 1909.

Arbuckle began his film career with the Selig Polyscope Company in July 1909 when he appeared in Ben's Kid. He appeared sporadically in Selig one-reelers until 1913, moved briefly to Universal Pictures, and became a star in producer-director Mack Sennett's Keystone Cops comedies. Although his large size was undoubtedly part of his comedic appeal, Arbuckle was self-conscious about his weight and refused to use it to get "cheap" laughs like getting stuck in a doorway or chair.

Arbuckle was a talented singer. After famed operatic tenor Enrico Caruso heard him sing, he urged the comedian to "give up this nonsense you do for a living, with training you could become the second greatest singer in the world."

Screen comedian

Despite his physical size, Arbuckle was remarkably agile and acrobatic. Mack Sennett, when recounting his first meeting with Arbuckle, noted that he "skipped up the stairs as lightly as Fred Astaire" and that he "without warning went into a feather light step, clapped his hands and did a backward somersault as graceful as a girl tumbler". His comedies are noted as rollicking and fast-paced, have many chase scenes, and feature sight gags. Arbuckle was fond of the "pie in the face", a comedy cliché that has come to symbolize silent-film-era comedy itself. The earliest known pie thrown in film was in the June 1913 Keystone one-reeler A Noise from the Deep, starring Arbuckle and frequent screen partner Mabel Normand.

In 1914, Paramount Pictures made the then unheard-of offer of US$1,000 a day plus twenty-five percent of all profits and complete artistic control to make movies with Arbuckle and Normand. The movies were so lucrative and popular that in 1918 they offered Arbuckle a three-year, $3 million contract (equivalent to about $ in  dollars).

By 1916, Arbuckle was experiencing serious health problems. An infection that developed on his leg became a carbuncle so severe that doctors considered amputation. Although Arbuckle was able to keep his leg, he was prescribed morphine against the pain; he would later be accused of being addicted to it. Following his recovery, Arbuckle started his own film company, Comique, in partnership with Joseph Schenck. Although Comique produced some of the best short pictures of the silent era, Arbuckle transferred his controlling interest in the company to Buster Keaton in 1918 and accepted Paramount's $3 million offer to make up to 18 feature films over three years.

Arbuckle disliked his screen nickname. "Fatty" had also been Arbuckle's nickname since school; "It was inevitable", he said. Fans also called Roscoe "The Prince of Whales" and "The Balloonatic". However, the name Fatty identifies the character that Arbuckle portrayed on-screen (usually a naive hayseed), not Arbuckle himself. When Arbuckle portrayed a female, the character was named "Miss Fatty", as in the film Miss Fatty's Seaside Lovers. Arbuckle discouraged anyone from addressing him as "Fatty" off-screen, and when they did so his usual response was, "I've got a name, you know."

Scandal

On September 5, 1921, Arbuckle took a break from his hectic film schedule and, despite suffering from second-degree burns to both buttocks from an on-set accident, drove to San Francisco with two friends, Lowell Sherman and Fred Fishback. The three checked into three rooms at the St. Francis Hotel: 1219 for Arbuckle and Fishback to share, 1221 for Sherman, and 1220 designated as a party room. Several women were invited to the suite. During the carousing, a 30-year-old aspiring actress named Virginia Rappe was found seriously ill in room 1219 and was examined by the hotel doctor, who concluded her symptoms were mostly caused by intoxication and gave her morphine to calm her. Rappe was not hospitalized until two days after the incident.

At the hospital, Rappe's companion at the party, Bambina Maude Delmont, told a doctor that Arbuckle had raped her friend. The doctor examined Rappe but found no evidence of rape. She died one day after her hospitalization from peritonitis caused by a ruptured bladder. Rappe suffered from chronic urinary tract infections, a condition that liquor irritated dramatically. 

Delmont then told police that Arbuckle had raped Rappe; the police concluded that the impact of Arbuckle's overweight body lying on top of Rappe had eventually caused her bladder to rupture. At a later press conference, Rappe's manager, Al Semnacher, accused Arbuckle of using a piece of ice to simulate sex with Rappe, thus leading to her injuries. By the time the story was reported in newspapers, the object had evolved into a Coca-Cola or champagne bottle rather than a piece of ice. In fact, witnesses testified that Arbuckle rubbed the ice on Rappe's stomach to ease her abdominal pain. Arbuckle denied any wrongdoing. Delmont later made a statement incriminating Arbuckle to the police in an attempt to extort money from Arbuckle's attorneys.

Arbuckle's trial was a major media event. The story was fueled by yellow journalism, with the newspapers portraying Arbuckle as a gross lecher who used his weight to overpower innocent girls. William Randolph Hearst's nationwide newspaper chain exploited the situation with exaggerated and sensationalized stories.  Hearst was gratified by the profits he accrued during the Arbuckle scandal, and he later said that it had "sold more newspapers than any event since the sinking of the Lusitania." Morality groups called for Arbuckle to be sentenced to death. The resulting scandal destroyed Arbuckle's career along with his personal life.

Arbuckle was regarded by those who knew him closely as a good-natured man who was shy around women; he has been described as "the most chaste man in pictures". However, studio executives, fearing negative publicity by association, ordered Arbuckle's industry friends and fellow actors (whose careers they controlled) not to publicly speak up for him. Charlie Chaplin, who was in Britain at the time, told reporters that he could not and would not believe Arbuckle had anything to do with Rappe's death; having known Arbuckle since they both worked at Keystone in 1914, Chaplin "knew Roscoe to be a genial, easy-going type who would not harm a fly." Buster Keaton reportedly did make one public statement in support of Arbuckle's innocence, a decision which earned him a mild reprimand from the studio where he worked. Film actor William S. Hart, who had never met or worked with Arbuckle, made a number of damaging public statements in which he presumed that Arbuckle was guilty. Arbuckle later wrote a premise for a film parodying Hart as a thief, bully, and wife beater, which Keaton purchased from him. The resulting film, The Frozen North, was released in 1922, almost a year after the scandal first emerged. Keaton co-wrote, directed and starred in the picture; consequently, Hart refused to speak to Keaton for many years.

Trials
The prosecutor, San Francisco District Attorney Matthew Brady, an intensely ambitious man who planned to run for governor, made public pronouncements of Arbuckle's guilt and pressured witnesses to make false statements. Brady at first used Delmont as his star witness during the indictment hearing. The defense had also obtained a letter from Delmont admitting to a plan to extort payment from Arbuckle. In view of Delmont's constantly changing story, her testimony would have ended any chance of going to trial. Ultimately, the judge found no evidence of rape. After hearing testimony from one of the party guests, Zey Prevon, that Rappe told her "Roscoe hurt me" on her deathbed, the judge decided that Arbuckle could be charged with first-degree murder. Brady had originally planned to seek the death penalty. The charge was later reduced to manslaughter.

First trial

On September 17, 1921, Arbuckle was arrested and arraigned on charges of manslaughter. He arranged bail after nearly three weeks in jail. The trial began November 14, 1921, in the city courthouse in San Francisco. Arbuckle hired as his lead defense counsel Gavin McNab, a competent local attorney. The principal witness was Prevon. At the beginning of the trial Arbuckle told his already-estranged wife, Minta Durfee, that he did not harm Rappe; she believed him and appeared regularly in the courtroom to support him. Public feeling was so negative that Durfee was later shot at while entering the courthouse.

Brady's first witnesses during the trial included Betty Campbell, a model, who attended the party and testified that she saw Arbuckle with a smile on his face hours after the alleged rape occurred; Grace Hultson, a local hospital nurse who testified it was very likely that Arbuckle raped Rappe and bruised her body in the process; and Dr. Edward Heinrich, a local criminologist who claimed that the fingerprints on the door to the hallway proved that Rappe had tried to flee, but that Arbuckle had stopped her by putting his hand over hers. Dr. Arthur Beardslee, the hotel doctor who had examined Rappe, testified that an external force seemed to have damaged the bladder. During cross-examination, however, Campbell revealed that Brady had threatened to charge her with perjury if she did not testify against Arbuckle. Dr. Heinrich's claim to have found fingerprints was cast into doubt after McNab produced a maid from the St. Francis Hotel who testified that she had thoroughly cleaned the room before the investigation took place. Dr. Beardslee admitted that Rappe had never mentioned being assaulted while he was treating her. McNab was furthermore able to get Nurse Hultson to admit that the rupture of Rappe's bladder could very well have been a result of cancer, and that the bruises on her body could also have been a result of the heavy jewelry she was wearing that evening.

On November 28, Arbuckle testified as the defense's final witness. He was simple, direct, and unflustered in both direct and cross-examination. In his testimony, Arbuckle claimed that Rappe (whom he testified he had known for five or six years) came into the party room (1220) around noon that day, and that sometime afterward he went to his room (1219) to change clothes after Mae Taub, daughter-in-law of Billy Sunday, asked him for a ride into town. In his room, Arbuckle discovered Rappe in the bathroom vomiting into the toilet. He then claimed Rappe told him she felt ill and asked to lie down, and that he carried her into the bedroom and asked a few of the party guests to help treat her. When Arbuckle and a few of the guests re-entered the room, they found Rappe on the floor near the bed tearing at her clothing and going into violent convulsions. To calm Rappe down, they placed her in a bathtub of cool water. Arbuckle and Fischbach then took her to room 1227 and called the hotel manager and doctor. At this point all those present thought Rappe was just very drunk, including the hotel doctors. Probably assuming Rappe would simply sleep it off, Arbuckle drove Taub into town.

During the whole trial, the prosecution presented medical descriptions of Rappe's bladder as evidence that she had an illness. In his testimony, Arbuckle denied he had any knowledge of Rappe's illness. During cross-examination, Assistant District Attorney Leo Friedman aggressively grilled Arbuckle over the fact that he refused to call a doctor when he found Rappe sick, and argued that he refused to do so because he knew of Rappe's illness and saw a perfect opportunity to rape and kill her. Arbuckle calmly maintained that he never physically hurt or sexually assaulted Rappe in any way during the party, and he also stated that he never made any inappropriate sexual advances against any woman in his life. After over two weeks of testimony with sixty prosecution and defense witnesses, including eighteen doctors who testified about Rappe's illness, the defense rested. On December 4, 1921, the jury returned five days later deadlocked after nearly forty-four hours of deliberation with a 10–2 not guilty verdict, and a mistrial was declared.

Arbuckle's attorneys later concentrated their attention on one woman named Helen Hubbard, who had told jurors that she would vote guilty "until hell freezes over". She refused to look at the exhibits or read the trial transcripts, having made up her mind in the courtroom. Hubbard's husband was a lawyer who did business with the D.A.'s office, and expressed surprise that she was not challenged when selected for the jury pool. While much attention was paid to Hubbard after the trial, some former jury members told reporters that they believed that Arbuckle was indeed guilty, but not beyond a reasonable doubt. During the deliberations, some jurors joined Hubbard in voting to convict, but they all recanted except for Thomas Kilkenny. Arbuckle researcher Joan Myers describes the political climate and the media attention to the presence of women on juries (which had only been legal for four years at the time) and how Arbuckle's defense immediately singled out Hubbard as a villain; Myers also records Hubbard's account of the jury foreman August Fritze's attempts to bully her into changing her vote to 'not guilty'. While Hubbard offered explanations on her vote whenever challenged, Kilkenny remained silent and quickly faded from the media spotlight after the trial ended.

Second trial
The second trial began January 11, 1922, with a new jury, but with the same legal defense and prosecution as well as the same presiding judge. The same evidence was presented, but this time one of the witnesses, Zey Prevon, testified that Brady had forced her to lie. Another witness who testified during the first trial, a former Culver Studios security guard named Jesse Norgard, testified that Arbuckle had once shown up at the studio and offered him a cash bribe in exchange for the key to Rappe's dressing room. The comedian supposedly said he wanted it to play a joke on the actress. Norgard said he refused to give him the key. During cross-examination, Norgard's testimony was called into question when he was revealed to be an ex-convict who was currently charged with sexually assaulting an eight-year-old girl, and who was also looking for a sentence reduction from Brady in exchange for his testimony. Further, in contrast to the first trial, Rappe's history of promiscuity and heavy drinking was detailed. The second trial also discredited some major evidence such as the identification of Arbuckle's fingerprints on the hotel bedroom door: Heinrich took back his earlier testimony from the first trial and testified that the fingerprint evidence was likely faked. The defense was so convinced of an acquittal that Arbuckle was not called to testify. His lawyer, McNab, made no closing argument to the jury. However, some jurors interpreted the refusal to let Arbuckle testify as a sign of guilt. After five days and over forty hours of deliberation, the jury returned on February 3, deadlocked with a 10–2 majority in favour of conviction, resulting in another mistrial.

Third trial
By the time of Arbuckle's third trial, his films had been banned, and newspapers had been filled for the past seven months with stories of Hollywood orgies, murder, and sexual perversion. Delmont was touring the country giving one-woman shows as, "The woman who signed the murder charge against Arbuckle", and lecturing on the evils of Hollywood.

The third trial began March 13, 1922, and this time the defense took no chances. McNab took an aggressive defense, completely tearing apart the prosecution's case with long and aggressive examination and cross-examination of each witness. McNab also managed to get in still more evidence about Rappe's lurid past and medical history. Another hole in the prosecution's case was opened because Prevon, a key witness, was out of the country after fleeing police custody and unable to testify. As in the first trial, Arbuckle testified as the final witness and again maintained his denials in his heartfelt testimony about his version of the events at the party. Buster Keaton is said to have been in the courtroom and provided important evidence to prove Arbuckle's innocence; Delmont was involved in prostitution, extortion, and blackmail. During closing statements, McNab reviewed how flawed the case was against Arbuckle from the very start and how Brady fell for the outlandish charges of Delmont, whom McNab described as "the complaining witness who never witnessed". The jury began deliberations April 12 and took only six minutes to return with a unanimous not-guilty verdict; five of those minutes were spent writing a formal statement of apology to Arbuckle for putting him through the ordeal, a dramatic move in American justice. The jury statement as read by the jury foreman stated:

After the reading of the apology statement, the jury foreman personally handed the statement to Arbuckle, who kept it as a treasured memento for the rest of his life. Then, one by one, the 12-person jury plus the two jury alternates walked up to Arbuckle's defense table, where they shook his hand and/or embraced and personally apologized to him. The entire jury proudly posed with Arbuckle for photographers after the verdict and apology.

Some experts later concluded that Rappe's bladder might also have ruptured as a result of an abortion she might have had a short time before the fateful party. Her organs had been destroyed and it was now impossible to test for pregnancy. Because alcohol was consumed at the party, Arbuckle was forced to plead guilty to one count of violating the Volstead Act and had to pay a $500 fine. At the time of his acquittal, he owed over $700,000 (equivalent to approximately $ in  dollars) in legal fees to his attorneys for the three criminal trials, and he was forced to sell his house and all of his cars to pay some of the debt.

The scandal and trials had greatly damaged Arbuckle's popularity among the general public. In spite of the acquittal and the apology, his reputation was not restored and the effects of the scandal continued. Will H. Hays, who served as the head of the newly formed Motion Pictures Producers and Distributors of America (MPPDA) censor board, cited Arbuckle as an example of the poor morals in Hollywood. On April 18, 1922, six days after Arbuckle's acquittal, Hays banned him from ever working in U.S. movies again. He had also requested that all showings and bookings of Arbuckle films be canceled, and exhibitors complied. In December of the same year, under public pressure, Hays elected to lift the ban. However, Arbuckle was still unable to secure work as an actor.

Most exhibitors still declined to show Arbuckle's films, several of which now have no copies known to have survived intact. One of Arbuckle's feature-length films known to survive is Leap Year, which Paramount declined to release in the U.S. owing to the scandal. It was eventually released in Europe. With Arbuckle's films now banned, in March 1922 Keaton signed an agreement to give Arbuckle thirty-five percent of all future profits from his production company, Buster Keaton Comedies, in hopes of easing his financial situation.

Aftermath

In November 1923, Minta Durfee filed for divorce from Arbuckle, charging grounds of desertion. The divorce was granted the following January. They had been separated since 1921, though Durfee always claimed he was the nicest man in the world and they were still friends. After a brief reconciliation, Durfee again filed for divorce, this time while in Paris, in December 1924. Arbuckle married Doris Deane on May 16, 1925.

Arbuckle tried returning to filmmaking, but industry resistance to distributing his pictures continued to linger after his acquittal. He retreated into alcoholism. In the words of his first wife, "Roscoe only seemed to find solace and comfort in a bottle". Keaton attempted to help Arbuckle by giving him work on his films. Arbuckle wrote the story for a Keaton short called Day Dreams (1922). Arbuckle allegedly co-directed scenes in Keaton's Sherlock Jr. (1924), but it is unclear how much of this footage remained in the film's final cut. In 1925, Carter DeHaven's short Character Studies, shot before the scandal, was released. Arbuckle appeared alongside Keaton, Harold Lloyd, Rudolph Valentino, Douglas Fairbanks, and Jackie Coogan. The same year, in Photoplays August issue, James R. Quirk wrote: "I would like to see Roscoe Arbuckle make a comeback to the screen." He also said: "The American nation prides itself upon its spirit of fair play. We like the whole world to look upon America as the place where every man gets a square deal. Are you sure Roscoe Arbuckle is getting one today? I'm not."

William Goodrich pseudonym
Eventually, Arbuckle worked as a director under the pseudonym "William Goodrich". Author David Yallop cites Arbuckle's father's full name as William Goodrich Arbuckle as the inspiration behind the alias. Another tale credits Keaton, an inveterate punster, with suggesting that Arbuckle become a director under the alias "Will B. Good". The pun being too obvious, Arbuckle adopted the more formal pseudonym "William Goodrich". Keaton himself told this story during a recorded interview with Kevin Brownlow in the 1960s.

Between 1924 and 1932, Arbuckle directed a number of comedy shorts under the pseudonym for Educational Pictures, which featured lesser-known comics of the day. Louise Brooks, who played the ingenue in Windy Riley Goes Hollywood (1931), told Brownlow of her experiences in working with Arbuckle:

He made no attempt to direct this picture. He just sat in his director's chair like a dead man. He had been very nice and sweetly dead ever since the scandal that ruined his career. But it was such an amazing thing for me to come in to make this broken-down picture, and to find my director was the great Roscoe Arbuckle. Oh, I thought he was magnificent in films. He was a wonderful dancer—a wonderful ballroom dancer, in his heyday. It was like floating in the arms of a huge doughnut—really delightful.

Among the more visible directorial projects under the Goodrich pseudonym was the Eddie Cantor feature Special Delivery (1927), which was released by Paramount and co-starred William Powell and Jobyna Ralston. His highest-profile project was arguably The Red Mill, also released in 1927, a Marion Davies vehicle.

Roscoe Arbuckle's Plantation Café 
Arbuckle and Dan Coombs, one of Culver City's first mayors, re-opened the Plantation Club near the Metro-Goldwyn-Mayer studios on Washington Boulevard as Roscoe Arbuckle's Plantation Café on August 2, 1928. By 1930, Arbuckle sold his interest and it became known as George Olsen's Plantation Café, later The Plantation Trailer Court and then Foreman Phillips County Barn Dance.

Second divorce and third marriage
In 1929, Doris Deane sued for divorce from Arbuckle in Los Angeles, charging desertion and cruelty. On June 21, 1932, Roscoe married Addie Oakley Dukes McPhail (later Addie Oakley Sheldon, 1905–2003) in Erie, Pennsylvania.

Brief comeback and death
In 1932, Arbuckle signed a contract with Warner Bros. to star under his own name in a series of six two-reel comedies, to be filmed at the Vitaphone studios in Brooklyn, New York. These six short films constitute the only recordings of Arbuckle's voice. Silent-film comedian Al St. John (Arbuckle's nephew) and actors Lionel Stander and Shemp Howard appeared with Arbuckle. One of the films (How've You Bean?) had grocery-store gags reminiscent of Arbuckle's 1917 short The Butcher Boy, with vaudeville comic Fritz Hubert as his assistant, dressed like Buster Keaton. The Vitaphone shorts were very successful in America, although when Warner Bros. attempted to release the first one (Hey, Pop!) in the United Kingdom, the British Board of Film Censors cited the ten-year-old scandal and refused to grant an exhibition certificate.

On June 28, 1933, Arbuckle had finished filming the last of the two-reelers (four of which had already been released). The next day he signed a contract with Warner Bros. to star in a feature-length film. That night he went out with friends to celebrate his first wedding anniversary and the new Warner Bros. contract when he reportedly said: "This is the best day of my life." He suffered a heart attack later that night and died in his sleep. He was 46. His widow Addie requested that his body be cremated, as that was Arbuckle's wish.

Legacy

Many of Arbuckle's films, including the feature Life of the Party (1920), survive only as worn prints with foreign-language inter-titles. Little or no effort was made to preserve original negatives and prints during Hollywood's first two decades. By the early 21st century, some of Arbuckle's short subjects (particularly those co-starring Chaplin or Keaton) had been restored, released on DVD, and even screened theatrically. His early influence on American slapstick comedy is widely recognised.

For his contributions to the film industry, in 1960, some 27 years after his death, Arbuckle was awarded a star on the Hollywood Walk of Fame located at 6701 Hollywood Boulevard.

In popular culture

Neil Sedaka references Arbuckle, along with Charlie Chaplin, Buster Keaton, Stan Laurel, and Oliver Hardy in his 1971 song "Silent Movies", as heard on his Emergence album.

The James Ivory film The Wild Party (1975) has been repeatedly but incorrectly cited as a film dramatization of the Arbuckle–Rappe scandal. In fact it is loosely based on the 1926 poem by Joseph Moncure March. In this film, James Coco portrays a heavy-set silent film comedian named Jolly Grimm whose career is on the skids, but who is desperately planning a comeback. Raquel Welch portrays his mistress, who ultimately goads him into shooting her. This film was loosely based on the misconceptions surrounding the Arbuckle scandal, yet it bears almost no resemblance to the documented facts of the case.

In Ken Russell's 1977 biopic Valentino, Rudolph Nureyev as a pre-movie star Rudolph Valentino dances in a nightclub before a grossly overweight, obnoxious, and hedonistic celebrity called "Mr. Fatty" (played by William Hootkins), a caricature of Arbuckle rooted in the public view of him created in popular press coverage of the Rappe rape trial. In the scene, Valentino picks up starlet Jean Acker (played by Carol Kane) off a table in which she is sitting in front of Fatty and dances with her, enraging the spoiled star, who becomes apoplectic. 

In the Gumby movie entitled Gumby: The Movie, the supporting character Fatbuckle is an affectionate reference to Arbuckle. 

Before his death in 1997, comedian Chris Farley expressed interest in starring as Arbuckle in a biography film. According to the 2008 biography The Chris Farley Show: A Biography in Three Acts, Farley and screenwriter David Mamet agreed to work together on what would have been Farley's first dramatic role. In 2007, director Kevin Connor planned a film, The Life of the Party, based on Arbuckle's life. It was to star Chris Kattan and Preston Lacy. However, the project was shelved. Like Farley, comedians John Belushi and John Candy also considered playing Arbuckle, but each of them died before a biopic was made. Farley's film was signed with Vince Vaughn as his co-star.

In April and May 2006, the Museum of Modern Art in New York City mounted a 56-film, month-long retrospective of all of Arbuckle's known surviving work, running the entire series twice.

Arbuckle is the subject of a 2004 novel titled I, Fatty by author Jerry Stahl. The Day the Laughter Stopped by David Yallop and Frame-Up! The Untold Story of Roscoe "Fatty" Arbuckle by Andy Edmonds are other books on Arbuckle's life. The 1963 novel Scandal in Eden by Garet Rogers is a fictionalized version of the Arbuckle scandal.

Fatty Arbuckle's was an American-themed restaurant chain in the UK named after Arbuckle.

The 2009 novel Devil's Garden is based on the Arbuckle trials. The main character in the story is Dashiell Hammett, a Pinkerton detective in San Francisco at the time of the trials.

NOFX's 2012 album Self Entitled has a song called I, Fatty about Arbuckle.

The 2020 remake of Perry Mason features a minor character named Chubby Carmichael who is based on Arbuckle. 

The 2021 French graphic novel Fatty : le premier roi d'Hollywood, by Nadar and Julien Frey, portrays the period from Arbuckle's early days in Hollywood to his death.

Arbuckle is referred to in a nonsensical fashion in "Have You Seen Me?", a song by comedy metal band GWAR on their album America Must Be Destroyed.

Filmography

See also
 List of actors with Hollywood Walk of Fame motion picture stars
 List of American comedy films

Notes

References

Further reading
 Arbuckle, Roscoe "Fatty," "What the Well-Dressed Man Will Wear," Photoplay, October 1921, p. 49.
 
 
 
 
 
 
 St. John, Adela Rogers (as told to), "Love Confessions of a Fat Man," Photoplay, September 1921, p. 22.
 
 The New York Times; September 12, 1921; p. 1. "San Francisco, California; September 11, 1921. "Roscoe ("Fatty") Arbuckle was arrested late last night on a charge of murder as a result of the death of Virginia Rappe, film actress, after a party in Arbuckle's rooms at the Hotel St. Francis. Arbuckle is still in jail tonight despite efforts by his lawyers to find some way to obtain his liberty."
 The New York Times; September 13, 1921; p. 1. "San Francisco, California; September 12, 1921. "The Grand Jury met tonight at 7:30 o'clock to hear the testimony of witnesses rounded up by Matthew Brady (District Attorney) of San Francisco to support his demand for the indictment of Roscoe ("Fatty") Arbuckle for the murder of Miss Virginia Rappe."
 Ki Longfellow, China Blues, Eio Books 2012,  Includes historical discussion of the merits of the Arbuckle case.

External links

 Arbucklemania website
 
 
 
 Crime Library on Roscoe Arbuckle
 
 Contemporary press articles pertaining to Arbuckle
 Literature on Roscoe Arbuckle
 Banned Film Resurfaces 90 Years After San Francisco Scandal at sfgate.com
 The Fatty Arbuckle Trial: The Injustice of the Century (2004)

1887 births
1933 deaths
20th-century American comedians
20th-century American male actors
20th-century American trials
American male comedians
American male comedy actors
American male film actors
American male silent film actors
Articles containing video clips
False allegations of sex crimes
Male actors from Kansas
Manslaughter trials
Paramount Pictures contract players
People acquitted of manslaughter
People from Smith Center, Kansas
Silent film comedians
Silent film directors
Slapstick comedians
Vaudeville performers